Maggie Jenkins (born 14 June 2001) is a New Zealand footballer who plays as a forward for United States college soccer team UCF Knights and who has represented New Zealand in football at both age group and international level.

Jenkins was a member of the New Zealand U-17 side at the 2016 FIFA U-17 Women's World Cup in Jordan, and again at the 2018 FIFA U-17 Women's World Cup in Uruguay, as well as at the 2018 FIFA U-20 Women's World Cup in France.

Jenkins made her senior début in a 5–0 win over Thailand on 28 November 2017.

References

External links

Living people
2001 births
Women's association football midfielders
Association footballers from Wellington City
New Zealand women's association footballers
New Zealand women's international footballers
UCF Knights women's soccer players
Expatriate women's soccer players in the United States
New Zealand expatriate sportspeople in the United States
New Zealand expatriate women's association footballers